Solomon Saddle is a snow saddle (about 1,850 m) located between the heads of Solomon Glacier and Foster Glacier, to the south of Fisher Bastion in Royal Society Range, Victoria Land. Named by Advisory Committee on Antarctic Names (US-ACAN) in 1994 in association with Solomon Glacier.

See also
 Susan Solomon
 Solomon Glacier
 Ozone hole

Mountain passes of Victoria Land
Scott Coast